The Houses of Parliament is the Palace of Westminster, the meeting place of the House of Commons and the House of Lords of the United Kingdom.

Houses of Parliament may also refer to:
 Chambers of parliament, the two houses of bicameral legislatures
 Houses of Parliament (Monet series), a series of paintings by Claude Monet of the Palace of Westminster
 Irish Houses of Parliament, seat of the former Parliament of Ireland
 Malaysian Houses of Parliament, seat of the Parliament of Malaysia

See also
 Parliament House (disambiguation)
 Parliament buildings (disambiguation)
 Legislative building